Many countries established governments in exile during World War II. The Second World War caused many governments to lose sovereignty as their territories came under occupation by enemy powers. Governments in exile sympathetic to the Allied or Axis powers were established away from the fighting.

Allied-aligned wartime governments 
Many European governments relocated to London during the period of Axis occupation, while other organizations were established in Australia and the United States to oppose occupation by Japan. The following list includes exiled colonial governments alongside those of sovereign nations, as well as resistance groups organized abroad that did not claim the full sovereignty of a government in exile.

Axis-aligned wartime governments 
The Axis powers hosted governments-in-exile in their territory. Most belonged to Axis-sponsored puppet regimes whose territory came under Allied occupation late in the war. The purpose of many of these organizations was to recruit and organize military units composed of their nationals in the host country.

Governments of the Baltic States 
In the aftermath of the occupation of the Baltic states by the Soviet Union, all three republics established some form of government in exile. These organizations persisted after the war as the territories were annexed to the USSR. They played a role in maintaining the State continuity of the Baltic states during the period of Soviet control.

Governments already in exile at the start of the war 
These exiled regimes were operating at the start of World War II and involved themselves in the conflict to varying degrees.

References

Further reading 
 

World War II-related lists
20th century-related lists
Lists of former entities
Lists of governments